Konin railway station is a railway station in Konin, in the Greater Poland Voivodeship, Poland. The station opened in 1921 and is located on the Warsaw–Kunowice railway and Konin–Kazimierz Biskupi railway. The train services are operated by PKP and Koleje Wielkopolskie.

The original station building, designed by Romuald Miller, was a two-wing construction modelled on a Polish gentry house. Miller designed similar buildings for Koło and Gdynia Główna (also demolished). The station building was replaced in 1977–1978.

Passenger trains on the line to Kazimierz Biskupi ceased in May 1996.

Train services
The station is served by the following service(s):

EuroCity services (EC) (EC 95 by DB) (EIC by PKP) Berlin - Frankfurt (Oder) - Rzepin - Poznan - Kutno - Warsaw
EuroNight services (EN) Cologne - Duisburg - Dortmund - Berlin - Frankfurt (Oder) - Poznan - Kutno - Warsaw
Express Intercity services (EIC) Szczecin — Warsaw 
Intercity services Szczecin - Stargard - Krzyz - Poznan - Kutno - Warsaw - Lublin - Przemysl
Intercity services Szczecin - Stargard - Krzyz - Poznan - Kutno - Warsaw - Bialystok
Intercity services Zielona Gora - Zbaszynek - Poznan - Kutno - Warsaw
Intercity services Wroclaw - Ostrow Wielkopolskie - Jarocin - Poznan - Kutno - Warsaw
Intercity services Szczecin - Stargard - Krzyz - Poznan - Kutno - Lowicz - Lodz - Krakow
Intercity services Bydgoszcz - Gniezno - Poznan - Kutno - Lowicz - Lodz - Krakow
Regional services (KW) Poznan - Wrzesnia - Konin - Kutno

References
Station article at bazakolejowa.pl

 This article is based upon a translation of the Polish language version as of July 2016.

External links

Railway stations in Greater Poland Voivodeship
Railway station
Railway stations in Poland opened in 1921